Darren Chiacchia (born September 18, 1964 in Buffalo, New York) is an American equestrian. He won a bronze medal in team  eventing at the 2004 Summer Olympics in Athens, together with Kimberly Severson, John Williams, Amy Tryon and Julie Richards. He also competed in individual eventing, placing 12th.

Chiacchia gained national attention in 2008 when he was thrown from a horse resulting in him being in a coma, the incident sparked debate about the safety of being an equestrian. He made headlines again in 2010 when a former sex partner whom he dated from February to June in 2009, filed charges and Chiacchia was arrested on felony charges for allegedly exposing the man to the HIV virus, the charges were dismissed as intercourse was defined as only being able to occur between a man and a woman. The case renewed discussion about laws that may discourage people for getting tested for the virus, which can lie dormant for many years.

The felony charge against Chiacchia was reinstated in 2013 after the Florida 5th District Court of Appeal reversed the lower court's decision.

The felony HIV-related charge was dropped against Chiacchia in February 2017. The prosecution in Marion County entered a nolle prosequi.

Chiacchia owns and operates Independence Farm, full-service breeding, training, and sales barn located in Western New York.  He volunteers his expertise as the Chair of the USEA's Events Rating Task Force.

Major Accomplishments
 2004 U.S. Olympic team member
 2003 Pan American Games individual gold medal champion (Windfall II)
 2002 World Equestrian Games U.S. team member
 2000 U.S. Olympic equestrian team traveling alternate
 2007 Pan American Games U.S. Equestrian representative

Horses

Windfall 2
(1992, Trakehner Stallion; owned by Tim Holekamp) Chiacchia and Windfall 2 had their best season ever in 2003 when they won the Individual Gold medal in the Pan American Eventing title at Fair Hill.

Better I Do It 
(14-year-old Swedish Warmblood gelding by Billion out of Concitia; Owned by Adrienne Iorio) Represented the U.S. at the 1995 Open European Championships in Italy with Fascination Street after a third place-finish in the CCI*** at Rolex Kentucky.

References

External links

1964 births
Living people
American male equestrians
American LGBT sportspeople
LGBT equestrians
Olympic bronze medalists for the United States in equestrian
Equestrians at the 2004 Summer Olympics
Sportspeople from Buffalo, New York
Medalists at the 2004 Summer Olympics
Pan American Games medalists in equestrian
LGBT people from New York (state)
Pan American Games gold medalists for the United States
Equestrians at the 2003 Pan American Games
Equestrians at the 2007 Pan American Games
Gay sportsmen
Medalists at the 2003 Pan American Games
21st-century American LGBT people